William Beach may refer to:

 Bill Beach (rower) (1850–1935), Australian sculler
 Bill Beach (jazz musician) (born 1953), American jazz musician
 Bill Beach (rockabilly musician) (born 1932), American musician
 William Beach (1783–1856), British politician
 William Beach (American politician) ( 1815–1860), American politician
 William Beach (economist), commissioner of U.S. Bureau of Labor Statistics
 William Dorrance Beach (1856–1932), American army officer
 William Henry Beach (1871–1952), British Army officer

See also
William Beech (disambiguation)